Zacheus Burnham (February 20, 1777 – February 25, 1857) was a farmer, judge and political figure in Upper Canada.

He was born in 1777 in Dunbarton, New Hampshire. He arrived in Upper Canada in 1797 and settled in Hamilton Township near the current site of Cobourg. He was able to acquire large land holdings, thousands of acres, in the region, some as compensation for survey work. He also helped in the economic development of the Newcastle District, building sawmills and grist mills on his property. He was also involved in the development of transportation links in the region and operated a large and productive farm. He served as a captain in the local militia during the War of 1812 and, in 1813, became a justice of the peace. He was elected to the 7th Parliament of Upper Canada representing Northumberland and Durham. In 1831, he was appointed to the Legislative Council for the province and, in 1839, he was appointed a judge in the Newcastle District court.

He died in Cobourg in 1857.

References 
Biography at the Dictionary of Canadian Biography Online

1777 births
1857 deaths
Members of the Legislative Assembly of Upper Canada
People from Northumberland County, Ontario
Members of the Legislative Council of Upper Canada
People from Dunbarton, New Hampshire
American emigrants to pre-Confederation Ontario
Canadian people of the War of 1812
Upper Canada judges
Immigrants to Upper Canada
Canadian justices of the peace